Ringing Gingle Bells was the Christmas album of the Korean girl group Chakra. The single of the album was "Lonely Christmas", with a music video accompanying it. The album sold about 100,000 copies.

Track listing 

 Lonely Christmas
 Syangjerie Naerin Chukbok (샹제리에 내린 축복)
 Rudolph Saseumko (루돌프 사슴코)
 Goyohan Bam (고요한 밤)
 Christmas Sirijeu (시리즈)
 Santa Claus Is Coming to Town
 Chakra X-mas
 Amazing Grace
 Feliz Navidad
 Seokbyeorui Jeong (석별의 정)
 Dwitbukchineun Sonyeon (뒷북치는 소년)
 Hey U (Remix) (리믹스)
 Yeonjugok (연주곡)

2000 Christmas albums
Christmas albums by South Korean artists
Chakra (group) albums